Tosya District is a district of the Kastamonu Province of Turkey. Its seat is the town of Tosya. Its area is 1,302 km2, and its population is 39,708 (2021). The district produces a third of Turkey's total rice harvest. Timber is another important industry in Tosya. The area which consists of Tosya and İskilip district of Çorum Province was known as Tarittara or Turmitta during the Hittite era.

Composition
There is one municipality in Tosya District:
 Tosya

There are 54 villages in Tosya District:

 Ahmetoğlu
 Akbük
 Akseki
 Aşağıberçin
 Aşağıdikmen
 Aşağıkayı
 Bayat
 Bürnük
 Çakırlar
 Çaybaşı
 Çaykapı
 Çeltikçi
 Çepni
 Çevlik
 Çifter
 Çukurköy
 Dağardı
 Dağçatağı
 Dedem
 Ekincik
 Ermelik
 Gökçeöz
 Gökomuz
 Gövrecik
 İncebel
 Karabey
 Karaköy
 Karasapaça
 Kargın
 Kayaönü
 Keçeli
 Kınık
 Kızılca
 Kilkuyu
 Kösen
 Küçükkızılca
 Küçüksekiler
 Kuşçular
 Mısmılağaç
 Musaköy
 Ortalıca
 Özboyu
 Sapaca
 Şarakman
 Sekiler
 Sevinçören
 Sofular
 Suluca
 Yağcılar
 Yenidoğan
 Yukarıberçin
 Yukarıdikmen
 Yukarıkayı
 Zincirlikuyu

References

Districts of Kastamonu Province